Chandris Line was a Greece-based shipping company founded in 1960 by Anthony Chandris to operate ocean liners between Greece and Australia. Initially the company also traded under the names Greek Australian Line, National Greek Australian Line and Europe-Australia Line. 

Following a period of expansion, in 1974 Chandris Line merged with Chandris Cruises—a separate company founded in 1960 by Anthony Chandris' brother Dimitri Chandris to operate cruises in the Mediterranean—to form Chandris Line Chandris Cruises. After 1977 the company concentrated solely on cruising and was rebranded Chandris Cruises. In 1985 Chandris Cruises acquired Fantasy Cruises, and subsequently their North American operations were rebranded as Chandris Fantasy Cruises. The company ceased trading in 1996. The funnels of all of their ships were emblazoned with the Greek letter chi, the first letter of the name Chandris in Greek (Χανδρή). The chi acted as a logo for both Chandris and their subsidiary and ultimate successor, Celebrity Cruises.

History

1960–1974

Chandris Line

In 1959 Anthony J. Chandris, son of the Greek freight shipping company owner John D. Chandris, decided to establish a new passenger shipping company to carry migrants from Europe to Australia. Together with his brother Dimitri Chandris, Anthony Chandris had previously been involved in Charlton Steam Shipping Company's failed migrant service in the 1940s, but now wanted to attempt entering the migrant trade again. In October 1959 Anthony Chandris purchased  from Union-Castle Line for £1.5 million as the first ship of the new Chandris Line. Following delivery to Chandris Line on 19 November 1959 the Bloemfontein Castle was renamed Patris and rebuilt with increased passenger capacity for migrant service. Anthony Chandris made two contracts to increase the profitability of the ship: with the Intergovernmental Committee on European Migration to carry assisted migrants from Europe to Australia; and with the Greek Government to carry mail from Greece to Australia. Following rebuilding the Patris first departed Piraeus with Captain Zannis X.Xenios, on 14 December 1959, arriving in Fremantle, Australia on 2 January 1960 and her final Australian destination, Sydney on 9 January 1959. Initially the Patris’s operator was marketed as Greek-Australian Line, later National Greek-Australian Line. 

The Patris proved highly popular on the Greece—Australia service, and in 1960 Chandris Line began looking for a second ship. During the northern hemisphere summer seasons of 1961 and 1962 the ship was chartered to Caribbean Cruise Line for cruises out of New York City, spending the rest of the year in liner service between the United Kingdom and Australia. In April 1962 the Bretagne was renamed , but she was destroyed by a fire while in drydock in April 1963. The Brittanys UK-Australia version was marketed as Europe-Australia Line.

In September 1963 Chandris Line acquired the Matson Line ship  as a replacement for the Brittany. Renamed , the ship entered service with Chandris Line on the United Kingdom—Mediterranean—Australia -route in December 1963. A second United States -built liner joined the Chandris Line fleet in November 1964 when  was purchased from the United States Lines. The Australis particularly proved to be an extremely popular ship on the run from United Kingdom to Australia, usually operating at full capacity. Chandris Line expanded further in 1965 when they acquired National Hellenic American Line and their sole ship, from Home Lines. Although the Queen Frederica was a relatively old ship, Anthony Chandris considered her to be well suited for the North American cruise market. During the summer months she was used for cruising out of New York, while during the winters she was used in Piraeus—New York and Piraeus—Australia liner services. For some time the Queen Frederica was marketed as a Chandris Lines/National Hellenic American Line ship. The Queen Fredericas cruise service from New York proved short, as new legislation came in effect in the US at the end of 1967, aimed at improving safety standards on cruise ships. Bringing the Queen Frederica in-line with the new requirements would have been extremely costly, and as a result she was withdrawn from the North American cruise service in September 1967. As a replacement Chandris Line acquired the former Union-Castle liner , which was renamed  and entered cruise service for Chandris Line in August 1968.

In 1970 Matson Line offered another of their ships—the second 1932-built Lurline, originally named Monterey and a sister ship to the Ellinis—for sale in 1970, Chandris Line were quick to purchase the ship.

Patris, which had served without interruption on the Greece—Australia service from 1959, was assigned to a new service in 1972 due to declining passenger numbers, offering a much-shortedned liner service from Singapore to Australia, alongside occasional cruises from Australian ports. A similar fate befell Ellinis in 1973, when she was taken off the declining UK-Australia liner service and reassigned for cruising on European waters.

Chandris Cruises

1974–1996: Chandris Cruises

With the number of liner passengers between Europe and Australia dwindling, the Britanis was taken off liner service and rerouted to full-time cruising in 1975. During the same year the north Australian city of Darwin had been almost completely destroyed in a storm, and Patris found employment as a temporary accommodation ship for the residents of the destroyed city. This occupation lasted for only a year, after which a radically new use was found for the ship: she was converted into a ro-ro car/passenger ferry and used on services linking Ancona in Italy to Patras and Piraeus in Greece. In 1979 Patris was sold to Karageorgis Lines who retained her in the same service.

The Chandris liner service to Australia was closed down in late 1977 when Australis arrived in Australia as the last ship carrying government-sponsored migrant. From there on all migrant transport was handled by airplanes.

Ellinis was taken out of service in 1980 and laid up at Perama Bay. She remained laid up for several years, being used as a source of spare parts for her sister ship Britanis. In 1988 Chandris founded a subsidiary, Celebrity Cruises, transferring the ex Italian liner Galileo to this new line. Celebrity prospered, with four newbuilt cruise ships entering service for them during the remaining Chandris years. Soon the popularity of Chandris grew tremendously low, with more focused needed on Celebrity, so it was decided to dissolve all other assets. After almost 37 years, Chandris Lines began to stop all operations in 1996, this plan ending with the phasing out of their Fantasy Cruises branch and layup of the Britanis in 1998. To this date only one Chandris ship, the cruise ferry The Azur, has not been scrapped.

Ships

Footnotes

References

 
 
 
 
 
 

Defunct cruise lines
Defunct shipping companies
Transport companies established in 1960
Transport companies disestablished in 1996
Shipping companies of Greece
Defunct transport companies of Greece
1996 disestablishments in Greece
Greek companies established in 1960